Atanas Chochev (born January 17, 1957) is a retired Bulgarian triple jumper and long jumper.

His personal best jump was 8.19 metres, achieved in July 1981 in Sofia. This ranks him seventh among Bulgarian long jumpers, behind Ivaylo Mladenov, Atanas Atanasov, Nikolay Atanasov, Petar Dachev, Nikolay Antonov and Galin Georgiev. In the triple jump he had 16.86 metres from Sofia 1980.

Achievements

References

1957 births
Living people
Bulgarian male long jumpers
Bulgarian male triple jumpers
Athletes (track and field) at the 1980 Summer Olympics
Olympic athletes of Bulgaria
21st-century Bulgarian people
20th-century Bulgarian people